Eyre Creek is a tributary of the Warburton River. It flows from the western southwest corner  of Queensland into the northeastern corner of South Australia.

Eyre Creek is fed by the Georgina River and Burke River in the vicinity of Marion Downs Station. The confluence of Eyre Creek and the Diamantina River is the source of the Warburton River.

References

Rivers of Queensland
Rivers of South Australia